Aunt Carrie's is a seafood restaurant in the Point Judith neighborhood of Narragansett, Rhode Island, opened in 1920 by Carrie and Ulysses Cooper. In 1994, Carrie's grandson Bill died; since then, his wife and now their two daughters run the restaurant.  

Family legend claims that the clam cake was invented here when Carrie Cooper added fresh clams to the corn fritters.

Diners, Drive-ins and Dives featured the shack on October 29, 2012. Taste of America on the Travel Channel also featured Aunt Carrie's.

In 2013, Fodor's wrote about Aunt Carrie's in its guidebook, saying "its peerless location and unpretentious atmosphere are the main draws, along with comfortable favorites like clam cakes, steamers, and fish-and-chips."

Awards and honors
Rhode Island Monthly Magazine – “The Best of Rhode Island” Award since 1988,
Yankee Magazine Travelers’ Guide - 1997 Editor’s Pick, 2012 named best lobster shack,
James Beard Foundation “America’s Classics” Award - 2007,

See also
 List of seafood restaurants

References

Seafood restaurants in Rhode Island
1920 establishments in Rhode Island
Buildings and structures in Narragansett, Rhode Island
Tourist attractions in Washington County, Rhode Island
James Beard Foundation Award winners
Restaurants established in 1920